The Badeschiff (in English, "bathing ship") is a floating public swimming pool in Berlin, the capital city of Germany. Situated in the East Harbour section of the River Spree, the Badeschiff allows citizens to swim in a sanitary environment near the river. The Spree itself is far too polluted to permit safe swimming.

The Badeschiff opened in the summer of 2004 as an art project organized by the Stadtkunstprojekte (City Art Project Society) of Berlin. It was created by local artist, Susanne Lorenz, with Spanish architects AMP and Gil Wilk, to enliven city life along a long-neglected stretch of the Spree.

The pool was converted from the hull of a vessel measuring eight by thirty-two metres. It is open to the public daily from 8am to midnight. Disc jockeys commonly spin records outside the pool entrance where there is also a bar.

References

External links
 Swimming at the Most Unusual Pool in Europe
 Badeschiff panorama at night 1
 Badeschiff panorama at night 2
 Badeschiff panorama at night 3
 Badeschiff Website (in German)

German art
Culture in Berlin
Buildings and structures in Treptow-Köpenick
Swimming venues in Germany
Sports venues in Berlin